Woodgrove Centre is a shopping centre on Vancouver Island in the harbour city of Nanaimo, British Columbia.

Woodgrove Centre  features  of retail space and is Vancouver Island's largest shopping centre. The centre has over 150 stores, among them are Hudson's Bay, Walmart Canada, Toys "R" Us, Winners, Sport Chek, Save-On-Foods, Chapters and Landmark Cinemas.

Woodgrove is owned and managed by Central Walk.

History
Woodgrove Centre opened in 1981 with Eaton's and Woodward's as its tenants. Woodward's filed for bankruptcy in 1993 and the space was taken over by The Bay. Eaton's closed in 1999 following bankruptcy. In 2000, the mall was expanded from 530,000 square feet to 724,713. The Bay moved to the former Eaton's location. The old Bay/Woodward's space was demolished for a Wal-Mart location which opened on July 11, 2002 after the Country Club Centre location closed the previous day.

On September 1, 2020, Weihong Liu of Central Walk bought the property from Ivanhoe Cambridge

Anchors

Current anchors
 Hudson's Bay (opened 1993)
 SportChek (opened 2000)
 Toys R Us (opened 1994)
 Walmart (opened 2002)
 Winners (opened 2000)

Former anchors
 Eaton's (closed 1999 and replaced with a relocated The Bay store)
 Marks & Spencer (closed 1993)
 SAAN (closed late 1990s)
 Safeway (closed 1994 and replaced with Toys R Us)
 Sports Experts (closed 1993)
 Woodward's (closed 1993 and replaced with The Bay)
 Woodwynn (closed 1995)

References

External links
 

Shopping malls in British Columbia
Shopping malls established in 1981
Buildings and structures in Nanaimo
Ivanhoé Cambridge